Jonathan Stone (April 29, 1823 – November 26, 1897) was a Massachusetts politician who served on the Common Council, and as the twelfth and last mayor, of Charlestown, Massachusetts; and on the Revere, Massachusetts, Board of Selectmen.

Notes

1823 births
1897 deaths
Mayors of Charlestown, Massachusetts
Massachusetts city council members
19th-century American politicians
People from Weare, New Hampshire